Tammy Jean-Jacques is a Dominican politician in the Labour Party. She served in the House of Assembly from 2010 to 2014.

Following the Labour Party's victory in the 2009 general election, Jean-Jacques was appointed a Senator by Prime Minister Roosevelt Skerrit and sworn in on 3 February 2010. She was only 25 at the time of her appointment. She subsequently became Treasurer of the Labour Party.

References

1980s births
Living people
Dominica Labour Party politicians
Members of the House of Assembly of Dominica
Dominica women in politics